Cabin John may refer to some place names in the United States:

Cabin John, Maryland
Cabin John Aqueduct
Cabin John Bridge
Cabin John Creek (Potomac River)
Cabin John Middle School
Cabin John Parkway